Vapur may refer to:

 A brand of BPA-free, collapsible, reusable water bottles, also known as Anti-Bottles
 A product of IonSense, a gas ion separator
 An electronic cigarette, using water vapor, aimed to help smokers quit
 A Turkish word for ferry or ship